Iacovos Hadjiconstantinou (Ιάκωβος Χατζηκωνσταντίνου, born 17 November 1994) is a Cypriot swimmer. He competed in the men's 400 metre freestyle event at the 2016 Summer Olympics, where he ranked 47th with a time of 4:03.53. He did not advance to the final.

References

External links
 
 
 
 
 
 

1994 births
Living people
Cypriot male swimmers
Olympic swimmers of Cyprus
Swimmers at the 2016 Summer Olympics
Commonwealth Games competitors for Cyprus
Swimmers at the 2014 Commonwealth Games
Place of birth missing (living people)
20th-century Cypriot people
21st-century Cypriot people